Stavitel'ský Robotník ("The Building Worker") was a Slovak language newspaper published by the Hungarian Building Workers Union. It was the first Slovak-language trade union newspaper; the Hungarian Building Workers Union created the paper due to its substantial Slovak membership. Its first issue was published on September 1, 1903, and subsequent publication was sporadic.

See also
Search engine results

References

Slovak-language newspapers
Defunct newspapers published in Hungary
1903 establishments in Austria-Hungary